"I Can Change" is the fourth single by American singer-songwriter Brandon Flowers from his second studio album, The Desired Effect.

Background and composition
The song contains elements from "Smalltown Boy" (1984) by Bronski Beat. Brandon Flowers wrote "I Can Change" upon request from Swedish house duo Axwell and Ingrosso, who asked if Flowers would collaborate with them for their upcoming album. Because Axwell and Ingrosso were unable to finish the song, Flowers decided to record it himself. He noticed similarities between the song he had been given by Axwell and Ingrosso and Bronski Beat's "Smalltown Boy" and thus decided to sample the melody from it. Coincidentally, Flowers later learned that Axwell and Ingrosso previously sampled "Smalltown Boy" for their 2006 single "Tell Me Why".

"I Can Change" features a vocal recording by Neil Tennant of the Pet Shop Boys, taken via a cell phone answering machine. Flowers has said of the recording: "We just talked about it, and we just had this gap in a verse and we needed to stick something in there. We were talking about it being a speaking part, and the greatest musical 'speaker' is Neil Tennant! His voice is like no other. I texted him if he would — he didn't even hear the song or the tempo or anything, I just texted him this line. I asked, will you send us a voicemail of yourself saying, 'When you're looking for a change'? And that was it. He sent us a voice memo, and we stuck it onto the track, from the phone. It was done within 20 seconds."

Reception
Billboard listed it as one of "20 Summer Pop Songs You Need for Your Summer Playlist".

Flowers performed this track on The Graham Norton Show and at the Royal Variety Performance (2015) at Royal Albert Hall.

Track listing

Credits and personnel

Brandon Flowers – songwriter, lead vocals, synthesizer
Steve Bronski – songwriter
Lawrence Cole – songwriter
James Somerville – songwriter
Axel Hedfors – songwriter
Sebastian Ingrosso – songwriter
Ariel Rechtshaid – producer, programming, drum programming, synthesizer
Roger Joseph Manning, Jr. – synthesizer
Nate Donmoyer – drum programming, synthesizer

Benji Lysaght – guitar
Ted Sablay – acoustic guitar
Tony Maserati – mixer
Neil Tennant – additional vocals
Erica Canales – backing vocals
Danielle Withers – backing vocals
Emily Lazar – mastering
Chris Allgood – assistant mastering

Credits adapted from The Desired Effect liner notes.

Charts

Accolades

References

2015 songs
2015 singles
Brandon Flowers songs
Island Records singles
Song recordings produced by Ariel Rechtshaid
Songs written by Axwell
Songs written by Brandon Flowers
Songs written by Jimmy Somerville
Songs written by Sebastian Ingrosso